CIZL-FM, known on air as Z99, is a radio station in Regina, Saskatchewan broadcasting at 98.9 MHz. It has studios with sister stations CJME and CKCK-FM at 2401 Saskatchewan Drive in Regina.

CIZL was founded in 1982 by Rawlco Communications. Its original format was modern rock, and has evolved over the years between the contemporary hit radio and Adult CHR formats. However, its name and logo have remained constant.

The station holds an annual charity event, the Z99 Radiothon, in support of the Regina General Hospital's neonatal intensive care unit.

References

External links
 
 

Izl
Izl
Izl
Radio stations established in 1982
1982 establishments in Saskatchewan